Skoryky is a village in Ternopil Raion of Ternopil Oblast in western Ukraine. It hosts the administration of Skoryky rural hromada, one of the hromadas of Ukraine. As of 2007 the population consisted of 603 people.

Until 18 July 2020, Skoryky belonged to Pidvolochysk Raion. The raion was abolished in July 2020 as part of the administrative reform of Ukraine, which reduced the number of raions of Ternopil Oblast to three. The area of Pidvolochysk Raion was merged into Ternopil Raion.

References

External links

  

Villages in Ternopil Raion